Lord, I Apologize is an album by American comedian Larry the Cable Guy. It was released on October 30, 2001 on Hip-O Records, and has been certified gold by the RIAA. As of 2014, sales in the United States have exceeded 883,000 copies, according to Nielsen SoundScan.

Track listing
"I Made the Big Time Now" – 2:52
"Looking Good at the Flea Market" – 3:15
"Couldn't Keep the Pizza Lit" – 2:23
"No Hair—Just a Red Head" – 3:29
"Keep the Chips Fresh" – 4:06
"Jump Up in the Air and Get Stuck" – 3:28
"Let Me Eat Your Shorts" – 4:07
"Can't Understand My Accent" – 1:43
"The Worst Dentist I've Been To" – 1:53
"Martians Got a Thing for Redneck Fellers" – 5:00
"Going in Circles for Two Hours" – 4:53
"People Like My Analogies" – 2:59
"Toddler Mail" – 3:27
"Lord, I Apologize" – 3:30
Musical track, featuring Mark Tremonti

Chart performance

Certifications

References

2001 debut albums
Larry the Cable Guy albums
2001 live albums
2000s comedy albums
Hip-O Records live albums
Live comedy albums